Dance with Me is a 2019 Iranian drama film directed by Soroush Sehhat. It's Sehhat's feature film directorial debut. The film screened for the first time at the 37th Fajr International Film Festival.

Plot 
A reunion of old friends for Jahangir's birthday when everyone is informed of his fatal illness - An inevitable confrontation with the current situation and the past - Series of the tensions and the reconciliations leading to a road to the life - however death is knocking on the door.

Cast 
Ali Mosaffa as Jahangir
Javad Ezzati as Ehsan
Hanieh Tavasoli as Nahid
Pejman Jamshidi as Reza
Siavash Cheraghipour as Hamid
Kazem Sayahi as Bahman
Mehrab Ghasemkhani as Ali
Bahar Katuzi as Niloufar
Ramin Sadighi as Faragh
Pavan Afsar as Nasim
Shiva Baluchi as Asa
Mahyar Pourbabaei as Shayan

Reception

Accolades

References

External links 
 

2019 films
2019 drama films
Films about death
Iranian drama films
2019 directorial debut films
2010s Persian-language films